Ferrante Rocchi Lanoir (born 11 April 1956) is a former professional tennis player from Italy.

Biography
A left-handed player from San Benedetto del Tronto, Rocchi played on the professional tour in the 1980s. His best performance on the Grand Prix circuit came in doubles when he partnered with Roberto Vizcaíno to make the semi-finals of the 1984 Tel Aviv Open. As a singles player he had a top ranking of 153 and reached the round of 16 at Saint-Vincent in 1986.

Rocchi is the Director of the Villa Carpena tennis complex in Forlì.

References

External links
 
 

1956 births
Living people
Italian male tennis players
People from San Benedetto del Tronto
Sportspeople from the Province of Ascoli Piceno